General Sir Allen Bayard Johnson  (2 May 1829 – 7 February 1907) was a senior British Indian Army officer who went on to be Military Secretary to the India Office.

Military career
Johnson was commissioned into the 5th Bengal Native Infantry in 1846.

He served in the Second Anglo-Burmese War in 1853 and took part in the fighting at Donabew and the capture of Pegu and went on to serve with the Jaunpur Field Force during the repression of the Indian Mutiny being present at the Capture of Lucknow in 1857.

He was appointed Military Secretary to the India Office in 1877.

He was appointed KCB in 1889 and promoted to General in 1892.

References

 

1829 births
1907 deaths
British Indian Army generals
Bengal Staff Corps officers
Knights Commander of the Order of the Bath
British military personnel of the Indian Rebellion of 1857
British military personnel of the Second Anglo-Burmese War